Lynn W. Enquist is professor emeritus in molecular biology at Princeton University, as well as founding editor of the journal Annual Review of Virology. His research focuses on neuroinvasive alpha-herpesviruses.

Education
Enquist received a bachelor's degree in Bacteriology from South Dakota State University in 1967. He received his Ph.D. in Microbiology from the Medical College of Virginia, Virginia Commonwealth University in 1971 with S. Gaylen Bradley studying streptomyces biology.  He did postdoctoral training at the Roche Institute of Molecular Biology from 1971 to 1973 studying bacteriophage lambda replication and recombination with Ann Skalka.

Career
He served in the Public Health Service from 1973 to 1981. He was a senior staff fellow at the National Institutes of Health in the laboratory of Dr. Philip Leader working with Robert Weisberg from 1974 to 1977 studying bacteriophage lambda site-specific recombination and development of recombinant DNA technology.  In 1977, he moved to the National Cancer Institute where he continued the development of recombinant DNA technology and also began his work on neurotropic herpes viruses.  In 1981 he left the National Cancer Institute to be research director at Molecular Genetics Incorporated in Minnetonka, Minnesota, where he worked on recombinant DNA based viral vaccines.  In 1984, he joined DuPont as a research leader, where he ran a laboratory studying neurotropic viruses.  In 1990, he joined DuPont Merck Pharmaceutical Company, where he was a senior research fellow working on developing neurotropic viruses as tools for gene therapy and studying the mammalian nervous system.  In 1993, he accepted the position of tenured full professor of molecular biology at Princeton University.  His research interests are in the field of neurovirology, specifically on the mechanisms of herpesvirus spread and pathogenesis in the mammalian nervous system.  He teaches an undergraduate course in virology and won the President's award for teaching excellence in 2001.

Research
Enquist's laboratory focused on understanding the molecular mechanisms by which neuroinvasive alpha-herpesviruses  spread in the mammalian nervous system. His work employs imaging technology, cell biology, and viral genetics to reveal how virion components move inside and between neurons. Experiments are divided between two general areas to visualize how infection spreads from one neuron to another in vitro (dissociated neurons) and in vivo (living animals and tissues). His students have developed compartmented neuronal cultures to establish separate fluid environments for neuronal axons and the soma from which they emanate. These compartmented neuronal cultures are used for in vitro study of directional infection of neurons by alpha herpesviruses. Students also have constructed a variety of herpesvirus mutants that define mechanisms of neuronal spread and provide useful tools for tracing neuronal circuitry in living animals and uncovering mechanisms of alpha-herpesvirus pathogenesis. Dr. Enquist has published 318 articles or books and is an inventor on four US patents.

Memberships

Enquist is the founding editor of the Annual Review of Virology. He is a member of the American Society for Microbiology, American Society for Virology, and the American Association for the Advancement of Science. He is a past president of the American Society for Virology. In 2015, Enquist became president of the American Society for Microbiology. He is a fellow of the American Academy of Microbiology and the American Association for the Advancement of Sciences (AAAS).  He was elected to the American Academy of Arts and Sciences in 2010.  He was a member of the National Science Advisory Board for Biosecurity from 2005 to 2012.

External links
 Faculty profile at Princeton University
 Enquist Lab Page

References

Princeton University faculty
American molecular biologists
Living people
American virologists
Fellows of the American Academy of Arts and Sciences
Fellows of the American Association for the Advancement of Science
Presidents of learned societies
Year of birth missing (living people)
Journal of Virology editors
Annual Reviews (publisher) editors